The Oaks, also known as Downs Calhoun House, Calhoun-Henderson House, and Lumley Farmstead is a historic home and farm complex located near Coronaca, Greenwood County, South Carolina. It consists of a two-story wood-frame I-house, built about 1825, with significant additions and alterations about 1845, 1855, 1880, and 1920. Also on the property are the contributing small storage building (c. 1850), two large cow/livestock barns (c. 1920), a farm workshop (ca. 1920), a dairy barn (c. 1950), an early-20th century livestock watering trough, and an early-to-mid-20th century gasoline pump.

It was listed on the National Register of Historic Places in 2010.

References 

Houses on the National Register of Historic Places in South Carolina
Houses completed in 1825
National Register of Historic Places in Greenwood County, South Carolina
Houses in Greenwood County, South Carolina